Alexander White Pitzer (1834–1927) was an American Presbyterian clergyman. He was the author of several books on theology, and was a professor of biblical history and literature at Howard University.

Biography

Alexander White Pitzer was born in Salem, Virginia, on September 14, 1834. He attended Virginia Collegiate Institute (Roanoke College) and was graduated as valedictorian from Hampden–Sydney College in 1854, and at the Danville Theological Seminary, Kentucky, in 1857, after which he was pastor of Presbyterian churches in Leavenworth, Kansas, Sparta, Georgia, and Liberty, Virginia, and in 1808 organized the Central Presbyterian church in Washington DC, where he served until 1898.

From 1875 he was also professor of biblical history and literature in Howard University in that city. He was a member of the Prophetic convention in New York City in 1878, and assisted in drafting and reported the doctrinal testimony adopted by the conference. He took an active part in promoting the union of the northern and southern divisions of his church. He received the degree of Doctor of Divinity. from Arkansas College in 1876.

He died on July 22, 1927 and is buried at East Hill Cemetery in Salem, Virginia.

Works
In addition to numerous contributions to denominational literature, he is the author of Ecce Deus Homo, published anonymously (Philadelphia, 1867); Christ, Teacher of Men (1877); and The New Life not the Higher Life (1878); The Origin and Work of the Central Presbyterian Church, Washington, D.C.: A Discourse (1880); The Manifold Ministry of the Holy Spirit (1894); Why Believers Should "Not Fear" (1896).

References

Further reading

Attribution

1834 births
1927 deaths
American Presbyterian ministers
People from Salem, West Virginia
Louisville Presbyterian Theological Seminary alumni
Howard University faculty